Carlo Villa (19 January 1766 – 9 February 1846) was an Italian politician. He was born in and was mayor of Milan.

References

1766 births
1846 deaths
18th-century Italian politicians
19th-century Italian politicians
Mayors of Milan